Marine National Bank is located in Wildwood, Cape May County, New Jersey, United States. The building was first built in 1908. In 1927 it was rebuilt and doubled in size. It was added to the National Register of Historic Places on December 20, 2000.

See also
National Register of Historic Places listings in Cape May County, New Jersey

References

Commercial buildings on the National Register of Historic Places in New Jersey
Neoclassical architecture in New Jersey
Commercial buildings completed in 1908
Buildings and structures in Cape May County, New Jersey
Wildwood, New Jersey
National Register of Historic Places in Cape May County, New Jersey
New Jersey Register of Historic Places
1908 establishments in New Jersey